Byword may refer to:

Byword (horse), a thoroughbred racehorse and sire from the United Kingdom
Byword (saying), a simple and concrete saying, popularly known and repeated, which expresses a truth based on common sense or practical experience (e.g. "a good byword to live by is 'prudence', especially when younger")

See also
 Example (disambiguation)